Given Imaging (Hebrew: גיוון אימג'ינג) is an Israeli medical technology company that manufactures and markets diagnostic products for the visualization and detection of disorders of the gastrointestinal tract. Until March 2014, it was dual-listed on both the NASDAQ and the Tel Aviv Stock Exchange, where it was a component of the TA-100 Index and the TA BlueTech Index. In March 2014 it was acquired by Covidien and became a private company. In 2015 Covidien was purchased by Medtronic.

Given Imaging pioneered the capsule endoscopy technology and has also developed capsule-based pH monitoring. Through Sierra Scientific Instruments, a subsidiary, Given Imaging also provides an array of diagnostic modalities including high-resolution manometry and ambulatory reflux monitoring. Given Imaging's technology is currently marketed in over 60 countries.

History 
Given Imaging was founded in 1998 by Gavriel Meron and Rafael Development Corporation (RDC) Ltd. based on the purchase of an early patent from Rafael Advanced Defense Systems Ltd. Initial funding for the company was provided by Elron Electronic Industries, Israel's leading technology holding company, in cooperation with Rafael. Today, Elron still holds 28% Given Imaging's shares. The idea for the solution was developed by Dr. Iddan, while working in the missile division of Rafael, where he envisioned that missile technology could be miniaturized to create a medical product.

The company's first capsule endoscopy products was named M2A capsule and received it CE marking in May 2001 and in August 2001 was cleared
by the US Food and Drug Administration (FDA) for visualization of abnormalities of the small intestine The capsule uses a radio developed for Given by Zarlink Semiconductor's medical team in San Diego and Jarfalla, Sweden.

In October 2001, Given Imaging had an Initial public offering on NASDAQ under ticker GIVN.) In September 2004, M2A capsule re-branded PillCam SB(R).

In March 2004, Given Imaging became a member of the Tel Aviv Stock Exchange

In November 2004, US FDA clears PillCam(R) ESO for the esophagus

In May 2006, US FDA clears Agile Patency System

In October 2006, PillCam COLON was cleared for marketing in the European Union (CE Mark)

In December 2008, Given Imaging acquired Bravo pH Monitoring System(R)

In May 2009, 1 millionth PillCam capsule was sold

In September 2009, PillCam COLON 2 receives CE Mark

In July 2012, Given Imaging's capsule endoscopy featured in a live broadcast on the BBC, when the reporter Michael Mosley spent the day as an exhibit at the Science Museum in London, after swallowing a PillCam which transmitted live pictures to a public screen.

In February 2014, 100% of Given Imaging's shares were purchased by Covidien, making it a Private Company fully owned by Covidien. As a result, its shares are no longer traded neither in NASDAQ nor in TASE

In 2015 Covidien was purchased by Medtronic

Products

PillCam SB 
PillCam SB is a patient-friendly tool for visualization of the entire small bowel and detection of small bowel abnormalities.  No sedation is needed, however bowel prep is needed. A liquid bowel prep is consumed before the procedure emptying the bowel completely, this allows clear photos to be taken.

PillCam ESO 
PillCam ESO provides a clinically proven, time-efficient and patient-friendly method for visualization of the esophagus.

PillCam COLON 2 
PillCam COLON 2 is complementary to traditional colonoscopy and is used for patients who have received incomplete colonoscopy, are contraindicated for colonoscopy or are unwilling to undergo traditional colonoscopy.

PillCam CROHN'S 
The PillCam CROHN’S system offers a solution by obtaining direct visualization of the entire small bowel and colonic mucosa with a noninvasive procedure.

PillCam Express 
In May 2010, Given Imaging released a new manually guided GI scope based on PillCam swallowable devices. In cases where patient anatomy does not allow for natural passage of large tablets the size of traditional PillCams, the PillCam Express can be delivered through the stomach and into the small intestine with help of an endoscope and a proprietary balloon deployment mechanism.

Bravo pH Monitoring System 
The Bravo pH Monitoring System is a catheter-free ambulatory pH test.  Ambulatory pH testing is considered the gold standard for pH measurement and monitoring of gastric reflux, helping clinicians manage gastroesophageal reflux disease (GERD).  Featuring data collection for up to 96 hours, Bravo allows patients to maintain their regular diets and activities, accurately reflecting normal physiologic conditions.

Sierra Scientific Instruments 
In April 2010, Given Imaging acquired Sierra Scientific Instruments, a leading provider of specialty GI diagnostic solutions and pioneer of high-resolution manometry for assessing gastrointestinal motility.   The ManoScan 360 High-Resolution Manometry System has advanced diagnostic technology that captures all relevant esophageal motor function from the pharynx to the stomach with a single placement of the catheter. An average esophageal study can be completed in 10 minutes or less.  The ManoScan 360 can be upgraded to incorporate an array of diagnostic modalities including manometry with impedance as well as anorectal and 3D HRM Manometry.  Sierra Scientific also provides the AccuTrac pH and pH-Impedance Monitoring System, pH and pH-Z disposable catheters and ManoShield disposable catheter sheaths for both esophageal and anorectal catheters. Additionally, Sierra Scientific offers the Polygraf ID stationary gastrointestinal function testing platform and the Digitrapper(R) ambulatory pH monitoring system.

Headquarters and plants

The company's corporate headquarters, research and development laboratories, and manufacturing facilities are located in Yokneam, Israel. It maintains offices in Duluth, Georgia and Heerlen, Netherlands. Additional sales and marketing offices are located in France, Japan, Australia, and Singapore. The company also has a plant in Ireland.

Given Imaging's wholly owned subsidiary, Sierra Scientific Instruments, is located in Los Angeles, California, with manufacturing operations in Vietnam.

See also
 Science and technology in Israel
 Health care in Israel
 List of Israeli inventions and discoveries
 Silicon Wadi
 Startup Village, Yokneam

References

Gastroenterology
Optics manufacturing companies
Medical technology companies of Israel
Companies formerly listed on the Nasdaq
Companies established in 1998
Israeli inventions